Paolo Odescalchi (died February 8, 1585) was a Roman Catholic prelate who served as Bishop of Penne e Atri (1568–1572), Apostolic Nuncio to Naples (1560–1561 and 1566–1569), and Apostolic Nuncio to Switzerland (1553–1560).

Biography
Paolo Odescalchi was born in Como, Italy.
In 1553, he was appointed during the papacy of Pope Julius III as Apostolic Nuncio to Switzerland.
On 15 Jun 1560, he was appointed during the papacy of Pope Pius IV as Apostolic Nuncio to Naples; he resigned from the position on 4 Sep 1561.
In Dec 1566, he was once again appointed during the papacy of Pope Pius V as Apostolic Nuncio to Naples.
On 27 Feb 1568, he was appointed during the papacy of Pope Pius V as Bishop of Penne e Atri and resigned as Apostolic Nuncio to Naples in February 1569. 
He served as Bishop of Penne e Atri until his resignation in 1572. 
He died in 1585.

Episcopal succession
While bishop, he was the principal consecrator of: 
Giambattista de Benedictis, Bishop of Penne e Atri (1572);
and the principal co-consecrator of:

References

External links and additional sources
 (for Chronology of Bishops) 
 (for Chronology of Bishops) 
 (for Chronology of Bishops) 
 (for Chronology of Bishops) 
 (for Chronology of Bishops) 

16th-century Italian Roman Catholic bishops
Bishops appointed by Pope Julius III
Bishops appointed by Pope Pius IV
Bishops appointed by Pope Pius V
1585 deaths
Apostolic Nuncios to the Kingdom of Naples
Apostolic Nuncios to Switzerland
People from Como